Silver Lake Mall is a shopping mall located located in Coeur d'Alene, Idaho. It is the largest indoor shopping center in North Idaho. Its anchor stores are Black Sheep Sporting Goods, Inspiro, Jo-Ann Fabrics, Macy's, and Planet Fitness.

Anchors
Black Sheep Sporting Goods
Inspiro
Jo-Ann Fabrics
Macy's
Planet Fitness

Former anchors
The Bon Marché (renamed Macy's in 2005)
Emporium (closed 2003; replaced by Sports Authority)
Gottschalks (replaced by The Bon Marché)
Lamonts (closed 2000; replaced by Gottschalks)
JCPenney (closed May 2021; replaced by Black Sheep Sporting Goods)
Sears (closed April 2018; replaced by Planet Fitness)
Sports Authority (closed August 2016; replaced by Insprio)

References

External links

Buildings and structures in Coeur d'Alene, Idaho
Shopping malls in Idaho
Shopping malls established in 1989
1989 establishments in Idaho